Rohan Ashok Khaunte (born 25 February 1974) is a politician and philanthropist from Goa. He is the Minister for Tourism, IT, E&C and Printing and Stationary in the Government of Goa. He is an MLA from Porvorim constituency from the North Goa district, Khaunte has previously served as Minister of IT, Revenue, Labour and Employment and Planning and Statistics and Evaluation in the Cabinet of Hon'ble Late Shri Manohar Parrikar. Rohan first contested the Goa Assembly Elections in 2012 as an independent candidate from the newly formed Porvorim Constituency and won by a majority of votes. In 2017 he became the first Independent MLA to be re-elected in Goa.

During his political career, Khaunte has initiated several social initiatives for public welfare under Porvorim Youth Welfare Trust. Rohan Khaunte is also the President of the Goa Boxing Association and Chairman of Sporting Clube de Porvorim.

Early life

Rohan Ashok Khaunte was born on 25 February 1974 to Late Ashok Khaunte and Mrs Sunanda Khaunte in Panjim city of the state of Goa and is an Electronics Engineer from Goa University. In his college days, Rohan participated in extracurricular activities as well as in academics, representing the State of Goa in Cricket, Basketball at the National Level, and Table Tennis at the university level. Rohan is involved in his family business which was founded by his late father. He was awarded the Young Entrepreneur Award by the then Governor of Goa, Late Shri Kidar Nath Sahani in the Year 2003.

Before embarking on his political career, Rohan Khaunte worked on building the Shiv Samarth Group, a business entity employing hundreds of Goans. Since his early youth, Khaunte believed in the importance of "being in the system to change the system". After spending time on the grassroots, Khaunte decided to enter politics in 2012 and won in the State Assembly Elections.

Political career

Rohan Khaunte is the Minister for Tourism, IT, E&C and Printing and Stationary in the Government of Goa from April 2022.

Rohan has played the role of an active opposition member pulling up the government on several issues such as traffic due to the construction of the third Mandovi bridge, Beach Cleaning Scam, Special status for Coconut Tree, etc.

During his first tenure (2012-2017) as the MLA from Porvorim, Rohan Khaunte implemented many initiatives, making Porvorim known as the Model Constituency of India. These initiatives brought about some upgrades in the constituency such as reduced power outages, electricity in every household, access to clean drinking water in every constituency, development of quality open spaces and efficient waste management.

Khaunte has been recognized for his leadership skills and execution. In 2013, he was selected as one of the 16 Young MLAs from across the country and conferred with the "Adarsh Yuva Award" by the Bharatiya Chhatra Sansad Foundation headed by the Former Chief Election Commissioner of India, Shri T.N. Seshan.

In May 2016, he submitted a complaint to the Goa Lokayukta about the multi-crore Beach Cleaning Scam and alleged that the tourism minister has received kickbacks in awarding the contracts.

In 2017 when Rohan Khaunte was re-elected as MLA by the people of Porvorim by a 4,213 vote margin. The only Independent candidate to have been re-elected to the Assembly, Khaunte was conferred the Lokmat ‘Goan of the Year’ title that year.

Khaunte ascended as the Cabinet Minister for IT, Revenue, Labour and Employment and Planning and Statistics and Evaluation in 2017. Owing to his track record as an administrator, the then CM Manohar Parrikar had confidence in Khaunte's ability to boost entrepreneurship, streamline revenue and generate employment for the State.

Rohan has worked actively in Porvorim and undertaken initiatives such as LiveFree – free Wi-Fi internet services, sewerage works, door-to-door garbage collection and segregation, street cleaning programs and hot mixing of roads. He has been lauded for setting up synchronized traffic signals along the National Highway that passes through the constituency. Despite no financial assistance from the government, Rohan implemented this project in record time.

Rohan has led in forming farmer's clubs in Porvorim with the objective to revive and encourage farming. He has formed 16 Bhajani Mandalsin his Constituency. Rohan has also supported Tiatr and Goan Art & Folk Dance. He is the founding Chairman of the Porvorim Yuva Welfare Trust, which was established in 2010.

Key reforms as Revenue Minister of Goa 

 Introduced a Single-window system to make basic documentation easy and transparent for the common people of Goa. 
 Integrated technology to simplify common services such as availing Residence, Income, Mediclaim, Caste Certificates, and various other government permissions with full transparency. Launched www.goaonline.gov.in for the same. 
 Implemented a disaster management system in Goa by setting up State and District Emergency Operation Centres and training and deploying task forces. 
 Envisioned and proposed a new Revenue Bhavan to streamline all the systems for a smooth experience for the citizens of Goa. 
 Optimized the process of Mutation and Partition, ensuring issues are resolved within 90 days with or without objections. 
 Transferred tenancy cases to Mamlatdar court to make handling of cases efficient.

Key reforms as IT Minister of Goa 

 Envisioned and implemented robust Startup Promotion policies, IT Policies and schemes to boost entrepreneurship in Goa.  
 Launched E-tendering and auctioning for convenience and transparency, leading to a growth of revenue for ITG Infotech Corporation of Goa from 10% to 45%.
 Proposed the setting up of a sustainable IT Park in Chimbel village and the formation of an Electronic Manufacturing Cluster in Tuem Village.
 Launched Goa's first Citizen Service Centre (CSC) adopted under the Right to Time Bound Services Act with a vision to reduce the time and efforts of Goans by getting rid of long procedures and bypassing all officers.
 Proposed the Project of Laying of Fibre Optic Internet to homes for providing high speed internet connectivity

Key reforms as Labour and Employment Minister of Goa 

 Set up a skill training academy in partnership with leading corporates to train Goan youth for the changing needs of industries.
 Proposed state-sponsored safe transport and night hostels for women working night shifts. 
 Launched 'Stri Sakhi Scheme' to ensure menstrual hygiene for women working at industrial sites. Eco-friendly sanitary pad dispensing machines and napkin incinerators were installed in several schools, colleges, and construction worksites. 
 Introduced a Smart Card system to ease the process of seeking employment for Goans. The cards had professional data of the candidates, which could be easily accessed by employers.
 Launched over 17 Schemes to benefit construction workers, a vulnerable segment in the unorganized sector often devoid of information and benefits due to lack of transparency. 
 Launched Model Career Centre to connect job seekers with relevant employment opportunities. 
 Commissioned multiple dispensaries under Employees State Insurance (ESI) Scheme, a task that was stuck in the bureaucratic processes for three years.  
 Upgraded Margao ESI hospital with 100+ beds and 3 ICUs.

Other initiatives and contributions 
Rohan has also set a benchmark with his progressive initiatives in his constituency of Porvorim, with modern panchayat Ghar, comprehensive sewage network, pathways from the road to farms for farmers, underground cabling network, and a 15-20 MLD Water Harvesting and Treatment Tank. Khaunte also took initiatives such as door-to-door garbage collection and segregation, several street cleaning programs for Porvorkars, and several beautification projects in Porvorim such as the recently launched grand Art Park.

Rohan Khaunte has contributed to social causes across the State of Goa from organizing multiple health camps, to donating smartphones to children from underprivileged backgrounds during lockdown to access online classes. With a focus on Women Empowerment, Rohan has helped start multiple Self Help Groups in Goa, most notably in Porvorim.

References

1974 births
Living people
People from Porvorim
Goa MLAs 2017–2022
Bharatiya Janata Party politicians from Goa
Goa MLAs 2022–2027
Goa MLAs 2012–2017
Former members of Indian National Congress from Goa